Duchess Worldwide, Inc., doing business as Duchess, is a privately owned and operated regional casual fast food restaurant chain that operates in southwestern Connecticut. Duchess was founded in 1956 by Harold and Jack Berkowitz in Bridgeport and based in Milford, Connecticut. There are 14 locations all in the Fairfield and New Haven counties of Connecticut. The restaurants feature an eat-in dining room, take-out service, and a drive-thru.

History 
In 1956, brothers-in-law and diner owners Jack and Harold Berkowitz bought a restaurant named Maraczi's that sold hotdogs and hamburgers in Bridgeport, Connecticut. The brothers needed to put a name on the paperwork and they decided to name the restaurant after Dutchess County, New York, without the "T". After the renaming, the Duchess fast food chain began to expand operations.  Duchess has expanded to 14 locations in the Fairfield and New Haven counties in Connecticut.

Duchess does not freeze their food and only cooks it fresh. Duchess offers more than 100 items on the menu and everything is cooked to order.

Locations 
Duchess has 13 locations and are found only in Connecticut:

Fairfield County 
 Bridgeport
 Darien
 Fairfield (2)
 Monroe
 Norwalk
 Shelton
 Stratford

New Haven County 
 Ansonia
 Milford
 Naugatuck
 Orange

Incidents 
On May 31, 1981, while responding to the report of a burglary at Duchess' Darien location, Officer Kenneth Bateman of the Darien Police Department was killed. The suspect escaped and remains at large. Bateman's murder remains the only unsolved killing of a Connecticut police officer on record. In 2015, Darien authorities offered a $100,000 reward for information about the murder.

See also 
List of fast food restaurant chains

References

External links 
 Duchess Restaurant website

Regional restaurant chains in the United States
Companies based in New Haven County, Connecticut
Restaurants in Connecticut
Milford, Connecticut
Buildings and structures in Fairfield County, Connecticut
Tourist attractions in Fairfield County, Connecticut
Restaurants established in 1956
Fast-food chains of the United States
Privately held companies based in Connecticut
1956 establishments in Connecticut